"Once Upon a Lifetime" is a song written by Gary Baker and Frank J. Myers, and recorded by American country music group Alabama. It was released in December 1992 as the third single from their  album American Pride. The song reached No. 3 on the Billboard Hot Country Singles & Tracks chart in March 1993.

Chart performance

Year-end charts

References

1992 singles
Alabama (American band) songs
Songs written by Gary Baker (songwriter)
Songs written by Frank J. Myers
Song recordings produced by Josh Leo
RCA Records Nashville singles
1992 songs